The Type 1941 torpedo boats were a group of 15 torpedo boats that were built for Nazi Germany's Kriegsmarine during World War II. Ordered in late 1942, none of the ships were finished before the German surrender on 8/9 May 1945, although four of the ships had been towed west to be completed earlier in that year. They were all either scuttled or demolished in the shipyard in 1945–1946.

Background and design
The start of World War II in September 1939 caused the cancellation of most of the planned Type 39 torpedo boats and only 15 ships were ordered. Shortages of labor and materials seriously hampered their construction so that the Kriegsmarine did not consider improvements until 1941.

Their hull was divided into 13 watertight compartments and it was fitted with a double bottom that covered 69% of their length. Their crew numbered 210 officers and sailors.

The turbines were designed to produce  for a speed of 34 knots.

Armament and sensors
The main armament of the Type 41 class consisted four 42-caliber  SK C/32 guns in single mounts; one forward of the superstructure, one between the funnels, and two aft, one superfiring over the other.

Anti-aircraft defense was provided by three twin 80-caliber  SK C/30 anti-aircraft (AA) gun mounts; two of these positioned on a platform abaft the rear funnel and another was in front of the bridge. The ships were also fitted with eight  C/38 guns in one quadruple mount on the aft superstructure and a pair of twin mounts on the bridge wings. The gun had an effective rate of fire of about 120 rounds per minute. Each ship carried 2,000 rounds per gun.

The Type 41s were also equipped with six above-water  torpedo tubes in two triple mounts amidships. For anti-submarine work the ships were fitted with four depth charge launchers and six individual cradles for 32 depth charges. They probably would have been equipped with the same electronics suite as the late Type 39s: a S-Gërat sonar, a FuMO 21 radar and FuMB7 "Naxos" and FuMB8 "Wanz G" radar detectors.

The ships of the second and third batches would have been fitted with a high-angle fire-control system to give their main battery an anti-aircraft capability. They also would have received fully automatic 3.7 cm Flak M42 guns in lieu of the semi-automatic SK C/30 weapons of the earlier ships.

Construction
The Kriegsmarine ordered T37–T42 from Schichau on 25 November 1942, although their turbines had been ordered in August 1941. A batch of six more, T43–T48, were ordered on 12 June 1943 and the final batch of four, T49–T51, on 11 January 1944. All were built at the company's shipyard in Elbing, East Prussia, (now Elbląg). T51 was cancelled before construction began. The Kriegsmarine originally estimated that T37 would be completed by the beginning of 1945, but labor shortages and other problems delayed the ships by two to three months. All work ceased at the shipyard on 22 January due to power failures, a lack of workers and the advancing Soviet forces which were approaching East Prussia.

T37, T38 and T39 were towed from Elbing around 23 January for completion at shipyards further west. T37 was intended to be finished at the Deschimag yard in Bremen, but was found in Bremerhaven by American troops at the end of the war with no further work having been done. T38 and T39 were towed to Kiel at the same time as T37; the former was also intended to go to Deschimag. No further work was done on either ship. T40 was towed west on 9 March, bound for Eckernförde with a cargo of a dozen Linsen explosive motorboats aboard, but ran aground at Brösen, Danzig, on the 12th. She was partially salvaged, but was scuttled shortly afterwards.

Ships

Notes

Citations

References

 

World War II torpedo boats of Germany
Torpedo boats of the Kriegsmarine